Alessandro Gandellini (born 30 April 1973) is an Italian former race walker.

Biography
Alessandro Gandellini participated at two editions of the Summer Olympics (2000 and 2004), he has 21 caps in national team from 1996 to 2006. He won five times the national championships at senior level.

Achievements

National titles
Italian Indoor Athletics Championships
5000 metres walk: 2000, 2002, 2003, 2004, 2005

See also
 Italian all-time lists - 20 km walk
 Italian team at the running events
 Italy at the IAAF World Race Walking Cup

References

External links
 

1973 births
Living people
Italian male racewalkers
Athletes (track and field) at the 2000 Summer Olympics
Athletes (track and field) at the 2004 Summer Olympics
Olympic athletes of Italy
Athletics competitors of Fiamme Oro
World Athletics Championships athletes for Italy
Mediterranean Games bronze medalists for Italy
Mediterranean Games medalists in athletics
Athletes (track and field) at the 2001 Mediterranean Games
21st-century Italian people